Hartmannsdorf is a village and a former municipality in the district of Greiz, in Thuringia, Germany. On 1 January 2023 it became part of the town Bad Köstritz.

References

External links

Former municipalities in Thuringia
Greiz (district)